A century leap year is a year in the Gregorian calendar that is evenly divisible by 400 and is thus a leap year. 

Like all leap years, it has an extra day in February for a total of 366 days instead of 365. In the obsolete Julian calendar, all years that were divisible by 4, including end-of-century years, were considered leap years. The Julian rule, however, adds too many leap days (about 3 extra leap days in 400 years), which resulted in the calendar drifting gradually with respect to the astronomical seasons. To remedy this, Pope Gregory XIII introduced in 1582 a slightly modified version of the Julian calendar, the Gregorian calendar, where century years are leap years only if they are divisible by 400. This eliminates 3 of the 4 end-of-century years in a 400-year period.  For example, the years 1600, 2000, 2400, and 2800 are century leap years since those numbers are evenly divisible by 400, while 1700, 1800, 1900, 2100, 2200, 2300, 2500, 2600, 2700, 2900, and 3000 are common years despite being evenly divisible by 4. This scheme brings the average length of the calendar year significantly closer to the astronomical length of the year, nearly eliminating the drift of the calendar against the seasons.

By coincidence rather than design, the Gregorian calendar repeats exactly every 400 years, so century leap years in the Gregorian Calendar always start on a Saturday, and the leap day in those years always falls on a Tuesday. The start days of the end-of-century common years also varies; the century year begins on a Friday if the remainder obtained by dividing it by 400 is 100, Wednesday if the remainder is 200, and Monday if the remainder is 300. Thus, only leap years that start on a Monday, Wednesday, and Friday can be skipped in the Gregorian calendar. 

The Gregorian calendar was introduced in 1582, but was adopted by various countries at different times over several centuries. Dates prior to 1582 are generally calculated using the Julian calendar, and different countries have different conventions about dates between 1582 and their adoption of the Gregorian calendar. (See, for example, Old Style and New Style dates.)

Notes

References

External links
 An Introduction to Calendars courtesy of the United States Naval Observatory
 Frequently Asked Questions about Calendars
 History of Gregorian Calendar

Units of time
Calendars
Julian calendar
Leap years in the Gregorian calendar

sv:Sekelskottår